The tawny tit-spinetail (Sylviorthorhynchus yanacensis) is a species of bird in the family Furnariidae. It is found in Peru, Bolivia and far northwestern Argentina.

Its natural habitats are subtropical or tropical moist montane forests and subtropical or tropical high-altitude shrubland. It is threatened by habitat loss.

References

Further reading

tawny tit-spinetail
Birds of the Peruvian Andes
Birds of the Bolivian Andes
tawny tit-spinetail
Taxonomy articles created by Polbot